is a Japanese mixed martial artist currently competing in the Featherweight division of Shooto. A professional MMA competitor since 2003, he has also competed for DREAM, and Vale Tudo Japan.

Biography

On May 12, 2006, Inoue defeated Antonio Carvalho by TKO in the first round to become the Shooto World Lightweight (143 lbs.) champion which he would go on to lose in his first title defense against Akitoshi Tamura on May 18, 2007. On November 8, 2007, he defeated Katsuya Toida to become the Pacific Rim Lightweight Champion.  

Inoue would eventually win back the Shooto World Championon November 29, 2008 after defeating Hideki Kadowaki by unanimous decision at Shooto's Tradition 4 show. He successfully defended his title against Rumina Sato, before losing it to Hatsu Hioki at Shooto – The Way of Shooto 3: Like a Tiger, Like a Dragon.

Championships and accomplishments
MMAFighting
2006 Featherweight Fighter of the Year
Shooto
Shooto Lightweight Championship (Two times)
One Successful Title Defense
Shooto Pacific Rim Lightweight Championship (One time)
2004 Shooto Lightweight Rookie Tournament Winner

Mixed martial arts record

|-
| Win
| align=center|1–0
| Hayate Usui
| Decision (unanimous)
| Shooto: Shooter's Dream 2
| 
| align=center|2
| align=center|5:00
| Tokyo, Japan
| 
|-
| Win
| align=center|2–0
| Masanori Sugatani
| TKO (cut)
| Shooto: Who is Young Leader!
| 
| align=center|1
| align=center|3:04
| Tokyo, Japan
| 
|-
| Win
| align=center|3–0
| Yohei Suzuki
| TKO (punches)
| Shooto: 3/22 in Korakuen Hall
| 
| align=center|1
| align=center|2:40
| Tokyo, Japan
| 
|-
| Win
| align=center|4–0
| Keisuke Yamada
| Decision (unanimous)
| Shooto: 7/16 in Korakuen Hall
| 
| align=center|2
| align=center|5:00
| Tokyo, Japan
| 
|-
| Win
| align=center|5–0
| Hayate Usui
| KO (punch)
| Shooto: Wanna Shooto 2004
| 
| align=center|2
| align=center|4:58
| Tokyo, Japan
| 
|-
| Win
| align=center|6–0
| Jin Kazeta
| Submission (rear-naked choke)
| Shooto: 3/11 in Korakuen Hall
| 
| align=center|2
| align=center|4:17
| Tokyo, Japan
| 
|-
| xLoss
| align=center|6–1
| Antonio Carvalho
| Decision (majority)
| Shooto: Alive Road
| 
| align=center|3
| align=center|5:00
| Yokohama, Japan
| 
|-
| Win
| align=center|7–1
| Akitoshi Tamura
| Decision (majority)
| Shooto 2005: 11/6 in Korakuen Hall
| 
| align=center|2
| align=center|5:00
| Tokyo, Japan
| 
|-
| Win
| align=center|8–1
| Makoto Ishikawa
| Decision (unanimous)
| Shooto: The Victory of the Truth
| 
| align=center|3
| align=center|5:00
| Tokyo, Japan
| 
|-
| Win
| align=center|9–1
| Antonio Carvalho
| TKO (punches)
| Shooto: The Devilock
| 
| align=center|1
| align=center|3:06
| Tokyo, Japan
| 
|-
| Win
| align=center|10–1
| Cole Miller
| Decision (unanimous)
| Shooto 2006: 7/21 in Korakuen Hall
| 
| align=center|3
| align=center|5:00
| Tokyo, Japan
| 
|-
| Win
| align=center|11–1
| Navid Yousefi
| Submission (rear-naked choke)
| Shooto: Champion Carnival
| 
| align=center|2
| align=center|4:35
| Yokohama, Japan
| 
|-
| Win
| align=center|12–1
| Hiroyuki Abe
| KO (punch)
| Shooto: Back To Our Roots 1
| 
| align=center|1
| align=center|4:05
| Yokohama, Japan
| 
|-
| xLoss
| align=center|12–2
| Akitoshi Tamura
| Decision (unanimous)
| Shooto: Back To Our Roots 3
| 
| align=center|3
| align=center|5:00
| Tokyo, Japan
| 
|-
| Win
| align=center|13–2
| Marc Duncan
| Submission (rear-naked choke)
| Shooto: Back To Our Roots 4
| 
| align=center|1
| align=center|3:16
| Tokyo, Japan
| 
|-
| Win
| align=center|14–2
| Katsuya Toida
| Decision (unanimous)
| Shooto: Back To Our Roots 6
| 
| align=center|3
| align=center|5:00
| Tokyo, Japan
| Won Shooto Pacific Rim Lightweight Championship.
|-
| xLoss
| align=center|14–3
| Savant Young
| Decision (unanimous)
| Shooto: Shooto Tradition 1
| 
| align=center|2
| align=center|5:00
| Tokyo, Japan
| 
|-
| Win
| align=center|15–3
| Hideki Kadowaki
| Decision (unanimous)
| Shooto: Shooto Tradition 4
| 
| align=center|3
| align=center|5:00
| Tokyo, Japan
| 
|-
| Win
| align=center|16–3
| Rumina Sato
| TKO (punches)
| Shooto: Shooto Tradition Final
| 
| align=center|1
| align=center|4:41
| Tokyo, Japan
| 
|-
| Win
| align=center|17–3
| Alexandre Franca Nogueira
| TKO (punches)
| Vale Tudo Japan 2009
| 
| align=center|4
| align=center|2:58
| Tokyo, Japan
| 
|-
| Win
| align=center|18–3
| Gerald Lovato
| Submission (armbar)
| Shooto: The Way of Shooto 1: Like a Tiger, Like a Dragon
| 
| align=center|3
| align=center|4:11
| Tokyo, Japan
| 
|-
| Loss
| align=center|18–4
| Hatsu Hioki
| Decision (split)
| Shooto: The Way of Shooto 3: Like a Tiger, Like a Dragon
| 
| align=center|3
| align=center|5:00
| Tokyo, Japan
| 
|-
| Loss
| align=center|18–5
| Kazuyuki Miyata
| Decision (unanimous)
| DREAM 16
| 
| align=center|2
| align=center|5:00
| Nagoya, Japan
| 
|-
| Win
| align=center|19–5
| Taiki Tsuchiya
| TKO (punches)
| Shooto: Shooto Tradition 2011
| 
| align=center|2
| align=center|4:27
| Tokyo, Japan
| 
|-
| Win
| align=center|20–5
| Koichiro Matsumoto
| TKO (punches)
| DREAM: Fight for Japan!
| 
| align=center|1
| align=center|6:51
| Saitama, Japan
| 
|-
| Win
| align=center|21–5
| Caol Uno
| KO (head kick)
| DREAM 17
| 
| align=center|1
| align=center|4:17
| Saitama, Japan
| 
|-
| Loss
| align=center| 21–6
| Hiroyuki Takaya
| Decision (unanimous)
| Fight For Japan: Genki Desu Ka Omisoka 2011
| 
| align=center| 5
| align=center| 5:00
| Tokyo, Japan, Japan
| 
|-
| Loss
| align=center| 21–7
| Kenji Osawa
| Decision (unanimous)
| Vale Tudo Japan: VTJ 1st
| 
| align=center| 3
| align=center| 5:00
| Tokyo, Japan
|Bantamweight debut.
|-
| Loss
| align=center| 21–8
| Yusuke Yachi
| Decision (unanimous)
| Vale Tudo Japan: VTJ 3rd
| 
| align=center| 3
| align=center| 5:00
| Tokyo, Japan
|Return to Featherweight.
|-
| Loss
| align=center| 21–9
| Rob Lisita
| Submission (bulldog choke)
| Rebel Fighting Championship 1: Into the Lion's Den
| 
| align=center| 2
| align=center| 3:19
| Kallang, Singapore
| 
|-
| Loss
| align=center| 21–10
| Isao Kobayashi
| Decision (unanimous)
| Vale Tudo Japan: VTJ 6th
| 
| align=center| 3
| align=center| 5:00
| Tokyo, Japan
|
|-
| Win
| align=center| 22–10
| Fumiya Sasaki
| Decision (unanimous)
| Mobstyles 15th Anniversary: Fight & Mosh
| 
| align=center| 3
| align=center| 5:00
| Tokyo, Japan
|
|-
| Win
| align=center| 23–10
| Yojiro Uchimura
| TKO (punches)
| Vale Tudo Japan - VTJ 8th
| 
| align=center| 2
| align=center| 4:17
| Urayasu, Chiba, Japan
|
|-
| Loss
| align=center| 23–11
| Yutaka Saito
| Decision (unanimous)
| Shooto - Professional Shooto 5/13
| 
| align=center| 3
| align=center| 5:00
| Kawasaki, Kanagawa, Japan
|
|-
| Win
| align=center| 24–11
| Mitsuhiro Toma
| Decision (unanimous)
| Shooto - Professional Shooto 9/23
| 
| align=center| 3
| align=center| 5:00
| Tokyo, Japan
|
|-
| Loss
| align=center| 24–12
| Mikuru Asakura
| TKO (flying knee and punches) 
| Rizin - Heisei's Last Yarennoka!
| 
| align=center|2
| align=center|2:39
| Saitama, Japan
|

Kickboxing record

|-
|
|Win
| Hiroki Shishido
|Shooto the Shoot 2011
|Tokyo, Japan
|Decision (majority)
|align="center"|3
|align="center"|3:00
|1-0
|-
|-
| colspan=9 | Legend:

References

External links

1980 births
Living people
Japanese male mixed martial artists
Featherweight mixed martial artists
Mixed martial artists utilizing shootboxing
Mixed martial artists utilizing judo
Japanese male kickboxers
Welterweight kickboxers
Japanese male judoka